Kim Young-bai (born 10 January 1941) is a South Korean former footballer who competed in the 1964 Summer Olympics.

References

External links
 
 

1941 births
Living people
South Korean footballers
Olympic footballers of South Korea
Footballers at the 1964 Summer Olympics
Korea University alumni
Footballers from Seoul
Association football midfielders